Ange Pacôme Gnagbo (born 4 February 1991) is an Ivorian football midfielder.

References 

1991 births
Living people
Ivorian footballers
Ivory Coast international footballers
Africa Sports d'Abidjan players
Séwé Sport de San-Pédro players
ASEC Mimosas players
AS Tanda players
FC San-Pédro players
Association football midfielders